Gayton is a rural village and civil parish in West Northamptonshire, England,  south-west of Northampton town centre. The village is situated on a hill close to the larger villages of Bugbrooke, Milton Malsor and Blisworth, with a linked public footpath network. At the 2011 Census, the population of the parish was 544.

History
The village's name is probably derived from Old English meaning "Gaega's farm/settlement".

Sited near Watling Street, the ancient way from the ports of Kent to Wroxeter, Gayton was not recorded in the Domesday Book survey of 1086 but was probably the unnamed settlement in the Hundred of Towcester held by the knight Sigar of Chocques, who came from the village of that name near Béthune in the north of France. By 1162 it had passed to his relation Robert V of Béthune, being inherited in turn by his eldest son Robert VI, by his second son William II, by William's eldest son Daniel and then by Daniel's younger brother. In 1248 Robert sold Gayton to Ingram of Fiennes, who in 1270 passed it to Michael of Northampton, a cleric.

Sir Philip de Gayton (d.1316), had two daughters, Scholastica de Gayton (d.1354), who married Godfrey de Meaux, and Julianna, who had a child, Mabila, with her husband Thomas de Murdak.  Juliana murdered her husband in 1316 with the assistance of family servants, and later married one, John de Veaux. They were tried for murder in 1321, and Juliana was hung at Tyburn. The facts of this tale have become somewhat confused over the centuries but the de Gayton tombs are in the village church.

Sir Francis Tanfield (d. 1558), governor of Lord Falkland’s Colony of Newfoundland, Canada 1623–25 built the Manor House in the village in the early 17th century and this house has some similarity to Sir Thomas Tresham's at Lyveden New Bield. It is probable that Sir Francis was the son of Clement Tanfield and his wife, Anne, of Gayton. He was born in 1565 and was knighted in July 1603 and, in September, accompanied the new ambassador, Lord Spencer, to the court of the Duke of Württemberg, now part of southern Germany. The Hughes of Gwerclas family, a Welsh family of native royal blood, resided at the Manor House during the late 18th Century.

There were three brickyards in the parish, now all gone and filled in with domestic refuse.

Iron ore quarrying 
The parish was also a source of ironstone which was quarried to the south east of the village, either side of the road to Blisworth up to and just beyond the crossroads with the road from Tiffield to Milton Malsor. The quarries began operation in about 1853 and continued to 1921 with possibly a break round about 1900. The quarries began close to the village and worked their way towards Blisworth as the ore was worked out. Quarrying was by hand with the aid of explosives. The ore was taken away by narrow gauge tramways in wagons pulled by horses for most of that time but a steam locomotive and a petrol engined locomotive were used from 1918. For the most part these tramways led to a standard gauge branch railway which ran from north east of the Gayton-Blisworth road to the main line with a junction facing Nether Heyford. This branch was at various times worked by horses or a steam locomotive. However one of the quarries, which operated between 1863 and 1884 had a tramway which led to another railway. This was the line from Blisworth to Towcester which was built in 1866. This line ran parallel to the earlier branch for most of the earlier branch's course and just to the east of it, but the junction with the main line faced Blisworth Station, rather than Heyford. The wagons from this quarry were lowered down the side of the cutting for the ore be loaded into standard gauge wagons. Until 1891 the ore from Gayton was smelted at Nether Heyford Ironworks but after this closed it was taken elsewhere. More modern quarries at Blisworth had a rail connection with the Northampton Towcester line nearer to Blisworth Station.

There is one gullet left and there are remains of some tramway bridges. Some of the quarried fields are now at a lower level than the roads. The quarried land has been restored to agriculture for the most part.

Governance
The village has a Parish Council. The local council is West Northamptonshire. Prior to local government changes in 2021 the district council was South Northamptonshire  where Gayton is in Harpole and Grange ward together with the villages of Milton Malsor, Rothersthorpe, Harpole and Kislingbury and elects two members.

Facilities

There is a church, dedicated to St Mary the Virgin. The base of the tower and font are Norman though the upper part of the tower 19th century.  The church contains six misericords dating from the 14th and 15th century, unusually, some of these have been modified at a later date, possibly by foreign carvers. There are monuments to Sir Philip and Scholastica de Gayton, Sir Francis Tanfield and his wife and also Mabila de Murdak, (14th century).

There is also a village hall and primary school, (Gayton Church of England Primary School), one of the smallest in the county with around 60 pupils. It also has two pub-restaurants. The Eykyn Arms is named after Roger Eykyn who live at Gayton House (probably 18th century, demolished 1972). The Queen Victoria nearby also offers accommodation.

There is a village green with a children's play area, refurbished in 2007.

Gayton is close to the Grand Union Canal (GUC). At Gayton Junction there is a marina and an arm of the GUC goes down to Northampton through a long flight of locks at Rothersthorpe. It is also close to the West Coast Main Line, one of the main railway routes between London and the north-west.

The site of a Roman building, which may have been a temple, is about 800 yards south-est of the village and was excavated in 1840 revealing a bronze statue and 4th-century coins.

Notable residents
Henry Montagu Butler academic
Sir Francis Tanfield - see above
Architect Sir Clough Williams-Ellis was born in Gayton, in 1883, and lived here until the age of four when he was taken to live in his father's native north Wales.

References

External links

Official Gayton Website

Villages in Northamptonshire
West Northamptonshire District
Civil parishes in Northamptonshire